Gongylolepis ( Gk. gongýlos γογγύλος "round") is a genus of South American flowering plants in the family Asteraceae. The following species are recognised by the Global Compositae Checklist:

Gongylolepis benthamiana R.H.Schomb.
Gongylolepis bracteata Maguire
Gongylolepis colombiana (Cuatrec.) Cuatrec.
Gongylolepis cortesii (S.Díaz) Pruski & S.Díaz
Gongylolepis erioclada S.F.Blake
Gongylolepis fruticosa Maguire, Steyerm. & Wurdack
Gongylolepis glaberrima S.F.Blake
Gongylolepis huachamacari Maguire
Gongylolepis jauaensis (Aristeg., Maguire & Steyerm.) V.M.Badillo
Gongylolepis martiana (Baker) Steyerm. & Cuatrec.
Gongylolepis oblanceolata Pruski
Gongylolepis paniculata Maguire & K.D.Phelps
Gongylolepis paruana Maguire
Gongylolepis pedunculata Maguire
Gongylolepis yapacana Maguire

References

Asteraceae genera
Flora of South America
Taxa named by Robert Hermann Schomburgk
Stifftioideae